"Angel Band" is an American gospel music song.  The lyrics – a poem written in common metre – were originally titled  "My Latest Sun Is Sinking Fast," and were written by Jefferson Hascall (sometimes found as Haskell in hymnals). The lyric was first set in J. W. Dadmun's tunebook The Melodeon in 1860, to a tune by Dadmun. These words, being in common metre, could be sung to many hymn tunes, but the tune now universally associated them is by William Batchelder Bradbury, and was published in Bradbury's Golden Shower of S.S. Melodies in 1862. Bradbury's song was originally titled "The Land of Beulah."  "Angel Band" became widely known in the 19th century, both in folk traditions and in published form, e.g. William Walker's Christian Harmony of 1866, and has been recorded by many artists, probably most famously by the Stanley Brothers, Emmylou Harris, and by the Monkees. The Stanley Brothers version is included on the O Brother, Where Art Thou? soundtrack album (2000).

References

External links
2004 Setlists on OtherOnes.net

Gospel songs
The Stanley Brothers songs
The Monkees songs
1860 songs
Songs written by William Batchelder Bradbury